The 1892 United States presidential election in New Jersey took place on November 8, 1892, as part of the 1892 United States presidential election. Voters chose 10 representatives, or electors to the Electoral College, who voted for president and vice president.

New Jersey voted for the Democratic nominee, former President Grover Cleveland, who was running for a second, non-consecutive term, over Republican nominee, incumbent President Benjamin Harrison. Cleveland won his birth state by a narrow margin of 4.43 points. This would be the last occasion the Democrats won Essex County until Franklin D. Roosevelt in 1936.

Results

Results by county

See also
 United States presidential elections in New Jersey

References

New Jersey
1892
1892 New Jersey elections